Kresson Golf Course is a public 18-hole golf course founded in 1960 in the Kresson section of Voorhees Township, New Jersey. The course has a total length of 4,026 yards from the men's tees, with a par of 68.

References

External links
Kresson Golf Course Scorecard

Golf clubs and courses in New Jersey
Buildings and structures in Camden County, New Jersey
Voorhees Township, New Jersey
1960 establishments in New Jersey